klia2 ERL station is a station on the Express Rail Link (ERL) which serves klia2, the low-cost carrier terminal at Kuala Lumpur International Airport (KLIA), Malaysia. The second ERL station to serve the airport, it began operations on 1 May 2014 in conjunction with the opening of klia2. The station is located on Level 2 at the Gateway@klia2 complex. It is served by both lines of the ERL, KLIA Ekspres and KLIA Transit.

The station consists of a single island platform. Similar to the arrangement at the KLIA ERL station, both services use the opposing side of the platform. KLIA Ekspres uses Platform A, while KLIA Transit uses Platform B.

klia2 ERL station is the southern terminus of the ERL line. All ERL trains stop at this station and KLIA station. From KLIA station towards the Kuala Lumpur city centre, KLIA Ekspres runs non-stop to KL Sentral, while KLIA Transit calls at three intermediate stops before terminating at KL Sentral.

See also
Public transport in Kuala Lumpur

External links
KLIA2 ERL Station | klia2.com.my
KLIA Ekspres now serving KLIA2

Airport railway stations in Malaysia
Express Rail Link
Rapid transit stations in Selangor
Railway stations opened in 2014
2014 establishments in Malaysia
Kuala Lumpur International Airport